Simon Seferings (born 5 July 1995) is a German footballer who plays as an attacking midfielder for Saburtalo Tbilisi.

Career
Seferings made his professional debut for 1860 Munich in the 3. Liga on 19 July 2019, starting in the home match against Preußen Münster before being substituted out at half-time for Dennis Dressel, which finished as a 1–1 draw.

References

External links
 
 
 

1995 births
Living people
People from Eschweiler
Sportspeople from Cologne (region)
Footballers from North Rhine-Westphalia
German footballers
Association football midfielders
FC Bayern Munich II players
SV Heimstetten players
TSV 1860 Munich II players
TSV 1860 Munich players
VfR Garching players
3. Liga players
Regionalliga players